Scienceworks may refer to:

Scienceworks (Melbourne), a science museum in Australia
ScienceWorks Museum (Ashland, Oregon), a children's museum in the United States